Open Cascade Technology (OCCT), formerly called CAS.CADE, is an open-source software development platform for 3D CAD, CAM, CAE, etc. that is developed and supported by Open Cascade SAS.

OCCT is a full-scale B-Rep (Boundary representation) modeling toolkit. OCCT is available under the LGPL-2.1-only license permitting its usage in open source and proprietary applications.

History
CAS.CADE (abbreviated from Computer Aided Software for Computer Aided Design and Engineering) was originally developed in the early 1990s by Matra Datavision, developer of Euclid CAD software as the underlying infrastructure for its future version Euclid Quantum. In 1998 the company abandoned software development to concentrate on services, and most of the software development facilities were sold to Dassault Systèmes, developer of competing CATIA.

Open sourcing
In 1999 Matra Datavision decided to publish its CAS.CADE infrastructure under an open-source model under the Open CASCADE Technology Public License and renamed it Open Cascade.

In 2000, a separate company, Open Cascade SAS, was created to make business around Open Cascade. Open Cascade SAS was sold in 2003 to Principia, a French service provider corporation, and then in 2006 it was acquired by Euriware Group, a subsidiary of Areva.

In 2004, software was renamed to Open Cascade Technology in order to distinguish it from the name of the company itself.

Open Cascade S.A.S. provides a certified version of the library, which is released sporadically, usually 1–2 releases per year. Until version 6.5.0 (2011), only minor and major versions were publicly available, while intermediate (maintenance) releases were accessible only to customers of Open Cascade S.A.S. For example, version 6.3.0 was publicly released in 2008, and the next public version 6.5.0 was released in early 2011. All recent releases starting from version 6.5.0 are public.

Community fork
In March 2011, Thomas Paviot initiated a fork of the then most recent publicly available version 6.5.0 of Open Cascade library. The initiative is called Open Cascade Community Edition. The project aims to establish a separate community-based release and bug-report process for the library.

Collaborative development portal
In December 2011, Open Cascade installed a web portal for external contributors and made its Mantis Bug Tracker and further Git repository publicly available (read-only GitHub mirror has been established in '2020). According to the statements on the new website, external contributors from the Open Source Community are encouraged to participate in the development of Open Cascade Technology, i.e. register bugs directly in the bugtracker, make contributions to the code after signing a Contributor License Agreement, etc.

License change 
Since 18 December 2013 with version 6.7.0 Open Cascade Technology is available under the LGPL-2.1-only with additional exception. Versions before that were licensed under the "Open Cascade Technology Public License" which was not compatible with the GPL and was considered non-free by the Fedora project.

Functionality

Object libraries
OCCT's functionality is split into several large modules. Each module defines a list of toolkits (libraries). Key Modules:

 Foundation Classes: defines basic classes, memory allocators, OS abstraction layer, collections (data maps, arrays, etc.), acceleration data structures (BVH Trees) and vector/matrix math used by other Modules.
 Modeling Data: supplies data structures to represent 2D and 3D geometric primitives (analytical curves: Line, Circle, Ellipse, Hyperbola, Parabola, Bézier, B-spline, Offset; analytical surfaces: Plane, Cylinder, Cone, Sphere, Torus, Bézier, B-spline, Revolution, Extrusion, Offset) and their compositions into B-Rep models.
 Modeling Algorithms: contains a vast range of geometrical and topological algorithms (intersection, Boolean operations, surface meshing, fillets, shape healing).
 Visualization: provides interactive services for displaying geometry in 3D Viewer; implements a compact OpenGL / OpenGL ES renderer, supporting conventional Phong, real-time PBR metal-roughness shading models as well as interactive Ray-Tracing/Path-Tracing engine.
 Data Exchange: provides possibility to import/export various CAD formats. STEP, IGES, glTF, OBJ, STL and VRML are supported natively. Other formats can be imported by using plug-ins. Extended Data Exchange (XDE) components rely on a unified XCAF document definition, which includes an assembly structure of CAD shapes, color/name/material/metadata/layer attributes as well as other supplementary information like PMI.
 Application Framework: offers solutions for handling application-specific data.
 DRAW Test Harness: implements a scripting interface to OCCT algorithms based on Tcl-interpreter for interactive usage, automating processes, prototyping applications and testing purposes.

Workshop Organization Kit
Workshop Organization Kit (WOK) is Open Cascade development environment, which has been designed to allow a large number of developers to work on a product getting advantage of common reference version shared over the local network.

Until OCCT 7.0.0 release, substantial modifications in the source code were not possible without using WOK, since it is the only tool that provides support for CDL (CAS.CADE definition language), used for declaration of most of OCCT classes and also serving to define logical structure of OCCT libraries. WOK has been included in previous OCCT distributions; since OCCT version 6.4 it is made an independent tool.

Within 7.0.0 release, all CDL files have been dropped from OCCT source code making WOK no longer necessary for OCCT development.

Working with IFC Files
The Open CASCADE IFC Import SDK provides applications with the capability of reading BIM data from files in IFC format.
It supports versions IFC2×3 and IFC4 that used by most modern applications.

This allows visualization and manipulation of building geometries and CAD designs.

External tools are available to convert from Open CASCADE to IFC as well.

CAD Programs based on Open Cascade Technology 

Several CAD programs rely on Open CASCADE Technology including:

 FreeCAD an open source, 3D parametric modeler, with support for building information modeling, finite-element-method (FEM), and Python scripting.
 SALOME an open source platform for pre- and post-processing for numerical simulation.
 KiCad an open source suite for electronic design automation (EDA).
 Gmsh an open source finite-element mesh (FEM) generator. Since version 3.0, Gmsh supports full constructive solid geometry features, based on OCCT.
 FORAN an integrated CAD/CAM/CAE system developed by SENER for the design and production of practically any naval ship and offshore unit. FORAN uses OCCT since V80R2.0 release for working with analytical surfaces.
 JSketcher a browser based parametric 3D modeler. 
 IFC Open Shell, a Python library for working with IFC data. Uses Open CASCADE internally to convert the implicit geometry in IFC files into explicit geometry that any software CAD or modelling package can use.

See also 

Free hardware
List of CAx companies
Computer-aided design
Open Design Alliance
 Building Information Modeling
 Industry Foundation Classes

References

Free computer-aided design software
Free software programmed in C++
Computer-aided design software for Linux
Computer-aided manufacturing software for Linux
Computer-aided engineering software for Linux
3D graphics software